Miryang (perhaps pronounced as Milbeol using Idu script), formerly also spelled as 推火郡 (probably pronounced as Milbeol or Miribeol using Idu script), Milbeol (密伐) and Milseong (密城), is a city in Gyeongsangnam-do Province, South Korea. Its name is originated from the tribal country named Miri midong guk (彌離彌凍國). There are various hypotheses as to the meaning of Miryang, such as Milky Way, Galaxy, dragon's field, The Wheat Field and the watery field. Neighboring cities include Changnyeong to the west, Cheongdo to the north, Ulsan to the east, and Yangsan, Gimhae, and Changwon to the south.  The city bird is the Korean magpie, the city tree is the pine, and the city flower is the royal azalea.

The recorded history of Miryang begins in the Samhan period, when it was known as Mirimidongguk.  Due to its strategic location near the Nakdong River, Miryang played an important role from the Silla period forward.  It served as an important station on the Great Yeongnam Road during the later Joseon Dynasty, and in the 20th century it became a station on the Gyeongbu Line railroad that connects Busan to Seoul.  Miryang remains a key stop along that line, and is now the only city between Busan and Daegu served by KTX express trains.

Miryang is known around Korea for the Miryang arirang and for the view from the Yeongnamnu pavilion, subject of numerous poems from the Joseon Dynasty.  Other noted landmarks include Eoreumgol and the temple of Pyochungsa.  Famous people from Miryang include 15th-century Neo-Confucian scholar Kim Jong-jik and 16th-century warrior-monk Songun Yu Jeong.  The city government works actively to maintain the memory of these figures, and of other local cultural features such as the tale of Arang.

History
During the Samhan , Miryang may have been part of the territory of Mirimidongguk, one of the Byeonhan tribes mentioned in the San guo zhi. Thereafter, it is believed to have been ruled by Geumgwan Gaya before being annexed by Silla. The Samguk Sagi records Mirimidongguk as being annexed by Jijeung of Silla in 505. In this period it was known as Chuhwa-gun. Under the general reformation of names carried out by King Gyeongdeok in the 8th century, the name was changed to "Milseong-gun".

In the Goryeo period (935–1392), Miryang was elevated to the status of a ju, Mil-ju, by King Seongjong. In 1194, Miryang was the site of a massive battle between royal forces and a massive rebel army led by Kim Sami of Cheongdo and Hyosim of Ulsan. More than 7,000 rebels were slain. Under King Chungnyeol in the late 13th century, local residents led by Jo Cheon rose up against the government; in retaliation, Mil-ju was demoted to a tributary village of Gyeongju (then Gyerim). Later it became a hyeon. Under King Gongyang, it was raised to the status of a bu.

With the dawn of the Joseon period (1392–1910), Miryang first became known by its modern name. Initially demoted from bu to gun (county) by King Taejo, it was then raised back to bu and its name changed from "Milseong" to "Miryang." Under Taejo's son King Taejong, it was once again demoted to gun. Later it became a dohobu, or military protectorate, and in 1895 it became a gun once again; it was to carry this status until late in the 20th century.

Under Japanese rule, Miryang was the site of various clashes between the Korean independence movement and the occupation forces. During the March First Movement of 1919, approximately 13,500 Miryang residents took part in peaceful demonstrations in support of Korean independence. This led to the "Miryang massacre," in which 150 Korean civilians were shot by occupation troops. In November 1920, independence fighter Choe Su-bong built and detonated two bombs at the Miryang police station, destroying the structure. He attempted to kill himself but was unsuccessful; later he was put to death and his accomplices were imprisoned.

In 1989 the city center was separated from the rest of Miryang and named "Miryang-si" (Miryang City). In 1995 the city center was reunited with the hinterland and the entire region became known as Miryang-si. Both of these were part of general reorganizations of South Korean local government.

Miryang gained national attention as the location of a notorious gang rape incident in 2004. At least 41 male high school students raped a middle school girl, while assaulting her younger sister and cousin, over the course of 11 months. Despite this atrocity, many Miryang residents blamed the victims for "seducing" the boys, and even the Miryang police officers prevented a thorough investigation, telling the victims that "Miryang is our hometown, and you ruined our city's reputation." All offenders were released with light punishments, which include in-class suspension and community service. None of the boys had to register as sex offenders. The rapists are presumed to be leading normal lives, while the victims have attempted to commit suicide numerous times.

Geography and climate

Miryang's geography is heavily influenced by the two rivers which flow through it, the Miryang and Nakdong Rivers.  All of Miryang lies within the Nakdong basin, and the Nakdong River itself runs along Miryang's southern border.  The city's topography generally slopes from the high peaks of the Yeongnam Alps in the northeast to the Nakdong valley in the southwest.  Much of the city is drained by the Miryang River, which rises in western Ulsan and flows through the city center to join the Nakdong at Samnangjin.  Portions are drained by other Nakdong tributaries, including the Naejincheon.

The Miryang River valley south of the city center broadens into a fertile plain.  This area, including large portions of Samnangjin-eup, Sangnam-myeon, and Hanam-eup, serves as a local breadbasket and is almost entirely devoted to rice-farming.  In Hanam-eup, it joins another plain running along the Nakdong.

As elsewhere in the Yeongnam region, the landscape is very lumpy, with many craggy hills and low mountains.  The highest mountain in Miryang is Gajisan, which stands on the northern border.  Other high peaks along the border include Hwaaksan and Cheonhwangsan (also called Jaeyaksan).  These peaks are part of the Yeongnam Alps, a branch of the Taebaek Mountains.

Further south, the mountains are lower but still quite frequent.  Notable peaks in this area include Maneosan in Samnangjin and Cheontaesan on the border with Yangsan.  Steep mountain valleys abound; these are often used for reservoirs that store water for irrigation or drinking purposes.  Some of the larger reservoirs in Miryang include Miryang Lake and Antae Lake.

Climate
Like most of the rest of South Korea, Miryang enjoys a relatively mild temperate climate.

The mountains along its north flank afford Miryang a measure of shelter from heavy winds and other severe weather coming from the north.  On the other hand, it is relatively vulnerable to damage from tropical storms encroaching from the south.

The Miryang and Nakdong valleys are subject to frequent floods during typhoons, as well as more predictable flooding during the monsoon season.  Other natural disasters are uncommon.

Administrative divisions
Miryang is divided into 16 primary divisions, of which 2 are eup (large villages [towns]), 5 are dong (city precincts [neighborhoods]), and 9 are myeon (rural areas [townships or sub-counties]).   Some of the dong are further subdivided, so that the city center is composed of eight legal dong in total.  The eup and myeon are broken into ri, of which Miryang has a total of 265 administrative or 119 legal.

Government and politics

Like other cities and counties in South Korea, Miryang enjoys a limited degree of local autonomy.  Since 1995, the mayor and city council have been elected directly by the local citizens.

The current mayor is Park Il-ho (박일호, 朴一浩), a member of the United Future Party 미래통합당.  He took office on June 30, 2014.

Economy
The economy of Miryang draws heavily on its central location and prominence as a tourist destination.  In addition, agriculture continues to play an important role, particularly in outlying districts.  The Miryang River valley supports extensive rice farming operations, while livestock farming is more common on higher ground.

Transportation

Miryang is roughly equidistant from Daegu and Busan, and is connected to both cities by road and rail.  By road, Miryang is served by two exits on the Daegu-Busan Expressway, as well as numerous national and local highways.  By rail, it is served both by the Gyeongbu Line (Seoul-Busan) and the Gyeongjeon Line (to Masan); the northern terminus of the Gyeongjeon Line lies just north of Samnangjin near the meeting of the Nakdong and Miryang Rivers.  Miryang is the only city between Daegu and Busan currently served by the KTX express train.

In addition to Miryang station in the city center, outlying regions are served by Samnangjin station and Sangdong station on the Gyeongbu Line, and Nakdonggang station on the Gyeongjeon Line.  These outlying stations are served only by a small number of Mugunghwa-ho passenger trains.

Except for Nakdonggang station, the stations in Miryang also serve freight trains.  The most active freight station is Sangdong, which sent out 74,762 tons of freight in 2004.

Culture

Miryang is known as the home of the Miryang arirang.  This is sometimes considered to be close to the original version of the arirang, which may have drawn its name from the Miryang area folktale of Arang.  The Miryang Arirang Festival is held each May to commemorate and keep alive this tradition and other aspects of local heritage.

Other preserved aspects of Korean traditional culture are the Baekjung performances.

The people of Miryang speak a version of the Gyeongsang dialect of Korean.  In studies of Korean dialectology, Miryang dialect has been contrasted with the Changwon dialect in terms of the use of pitch.

Miryang is notable for being filming location and the setting of the 2007 film Miryang (released in English-language markets under the title Secret Sunshine).

Education
The history of education in Miryang can be traced back to the Goryeo period, when a hyanggyo, a government-run village school, was constructed in the town center (modern-day Gyo-dong).  This school, famed for its size, continued in operation through the Joseon period, although it was gradually supplanted by numerous local seodang and seowon. All of these institutions concentrated on training young men for the royal civil service examinations.  This system lasted until the abolition of the examinations in the Gabo Reforms of 1894.

Today in Miryang, as elsewhere in South Korea, compulsory public education is provided for all students through middle school, and almost all students complete high school as well.  Education within the city is overseen by the Miryang Office of Education, which is administered directly by the Gyeongsangnam-do provincial Office of Education.  This is in turn accountable to the national Ministry of Education, which sets the national curriculum for all schools.

There are 23 elementary schools, 14 middle schools, and 8 high schools in Miryang.  Supplementary private education is offered through hagwons, which are strongly concentrated in the city center, with some in outlying towns.

There is only one institution of higher education in Miryang.  This is the Miryang campus of Pusan National University.  The Miryang campus primarily serves science and technology students, hosting the College of Nano Science and Technology and the College of Biological Sciences.  It is located in northern Samnangjin-eup, roughly 9 km from the Miryang city center.  A branch campus, formerly the main campus, is located near downtown Miryang.  These two campuses were merged into Pusan National University in 2006.  Previously, they made up a separate university called Miryang National University, which traced its roots back to 1923.

Tourism

Miryang has been known for centuries for its scenery of mountains and valleys; the Yeongnamnu pavilion overlooking the Miryang River appears in numerous Joseon Dynasty writings. The northeastern corner of the city occupies a portion of the Yeongnam Alps; part of this region is included in Gajisan Provincial Park.  Noted natural landmarks include the "ice valley" of Eoreumgol, also located in the northeast.

A number of noted historic landmarks are found in Miryang.  These include various seowon, or Confucian academies, including the Yerim Seowon dedicated to Kim Jong-jik and the Pyochung Seowon, which is the only seowon constructed inside a Buddhist temple (Pyochungsa).  The Yeongnamnu pavilion and nearby buildings date from the Joseon and Goryeo periods.  South Korean National Treasure No. 75 is located at Pyochungsa.

Yangyangji, which was built during the Silla Dynasty, was a water reservoir for the rice paddies, but it lost its original function due to a huge additional reservoir. But instead of putting water on the rice fields, the park attracts many tourists with picturesque scenery.

Twin towns – sister cities
Miryang  is twinned with:

  Yasugi, Shimane, Japan (1990) 
  Ōmihachiman, Shiga, Japan (1994) 
  Benxi, Liaoning, China (1998) 
  Namwon, North Jeolla, South Korea (1999) 
  Ulan Hot, Inner Mongolia, China (1999) 
  New Milford, New Jersey, United States (2004) 
  Handan, Hebei, China (2004)
  Setouchi, Okayama, Japan (2006)
  Nanping, Fujian, China (2016)

See also
 Secret Sunshine
 List of cities in South Korea

References

Bibliography

External links
City government website

 
Cities in South Gyeongsang Province